The 1989 Belgian Grand Prix was a Formula One motor race held at Spa-Francorchamps on 27 August 1989. It was the eleventh race of the 1989 Formula One World Championship.

The 44-lap race was won from pole position by Brazilian driver Ayrton Senna, driving a McLaren-Honda. Senna finished just ahead of French teammate Alain Prost, with Briton Nigel Mansell third in a Ferrari. The win, Senna's fifth of the season, moved him to within 11 points of Prost in the Drivers' Championship.

Qualifying

Pre-qualifying report
In the Friday morning pre-qualifying session, an Onyx topped the time sheets for the fifth Grand Prix in succession. Stefan Johansson was again comfortably fastest by over a second, and his team-mate Bertrand Gachot also pre-qualified in third. The other two pre-qualifiers were the Larrousse-Lola cars of Michele Alboreto in second, and Philippe Alliot in fourth.

Those failing to proceed to the main qualifying sessions included both Osellas; Nicola Larini and Piercarlo Ghinzani close together in fifth and sixth. Roberto Moreno was seventh in his Coloni, with the AGS of Gabriele Tarquini eighth. The struggling Zakspeed drivers were ninth and tenth, Bernd Schneider marginally faster than Aguri Suzuki. The other AGS of Yannick Dalmas was next, ahead of Gregor Foitek, driving the older EuroBrun ER188B after the new car had not been successful. Foitek quit the team after this Grand Prix, to be replaced by their 1988 driver Oscar Larrauri. Bottom of the time sheets was the second Coloni of debutant Enrico Bertaggia, who was unable to put a proper timed lap together. He was replacing Pierre-Henri Raphanel, who had left Coloni to join Rial after Volker Weidler had quit the team.

Pre-qualifying classification

Qualifying report

Ayrton Senna took his eighth pole position of the season by nearly six-tenths of a second from McLaren teammate Alain Prost, with almost a further second back to Gerhard Berger in the Ferrari in third. The two Williams were fourth and fifth with Thierry Boutsen, in his home race, ahead of Riccardo Patrese, followed by Nigel Mansell in the second Ferrari. Alessandro Nannini was seventh in the Benetton, over two seconds behind Mansell, and the top ten was completed by Stefano Modena in the Brabham, Maurício Gugelmin in the March and Derek Warwick in the Arrows.

The major talking point, however, was the failure of both Nelson Piquet and Satoru Nakajima to qualify, the first time in the Lotus team's history that neither of its cars had qualified.

All the times were determined in the second qualifying session, after the first had taken place in wet conditions.

Qualifying classification

Race

Race report

The race was delayed for some time due to the wet conditions. At the start, Senna led the way from Prost and Berger. Mansell managed to pass both Williams on the grass on the run to La Source hairpin to claim fourth position by the first corner. Johnny Herbert retired when he spun off on lap 4 in his first race for Tyrrell. René Arnoux then retired in the pit lane on lap 5 after a collision with the Lola of Philippe Alliot at La Source. Early on, Berger pressured Prost but was unable to find a way through. Senna comfortably led from start to finish in conditions similar to those in which he won his first Belgian Grand Prix in 1985. Behind him, Berger suffered his tenth consecutive retirement of the season when he spun out on lap 10, leaving Prost to fend off a charging Mansell who, in his efforts to pass the McLaren, made a number of unorthodox moves at the exit of La Source in an attempt to gain a better run at the McLaren through Eau Rouge and on to the long uphill straight. Senna eased up in the last few laps, allowing Prost and Mansell to finish within two seconds of him. Boutsen finished fourth in his 100th race. Johnny Herbert, in his first race for Tyrrell (replacing Jean Alesi who was busy competing in the F3000 championship), said during the BBC commentary that in order to see the car in front it was necessary to press the helmet visor against the lens of the rear-facing visibility light from the car in front. Unusually, Eddie Cheever received the black and white warning flag for 'unsportsmanlike behaviour' for his alleged baulking of Mansell.

Race classification

Championship standings after the race

Drivers' Championship standings

Constructors' Championship standings

References

Belgian Grand Prix
Belgian Grand Prix
Grand Prix
Belgian Grand Prix